Muhsin ibn Ali, also spelled Mohsin, was the youngest son of Fatima bint Muhammad and Ali ibn Abi Talib, and thus a maternal grandson of the Islamic prophet Muhammad. He was a brother of Husayn and Hasan. 

Controversy surrounds the fate of Muhsin as some canonical Shia sources report that Muhsin died in miscarriage, following a raid on her house led by Umar, a companion of Muhammad. Alternatively, Sunnis hold that Muhsin died in infancy of natural causes.

Name 

The name Muhsin, like those of his brothers Hasan and Husayn, comes from the Arabic root Ḥ-S-N. Muhsin can mean 'beneficent,' 'benefactor,' or 'one who does the act of helping.'

Historical background

Saqifa 
In the immediate aftermath of Muhammad's death in 11/632, the Ansar (natives of Medina) gathered in the Saqifa of the Sa'ida clan. The conventional wisdom is that they met to decide on a new leader for the Muslim community among themselves. For Madelung, however, the absence of the Muhajirun (migrants from Mecca) from this meeting suggests that the Ansar gathered to re-establish the control of the Ansar over their city Medina, under the belief that the Muhajirun would mostly return to Mecca after Muhammad's death.

Abu Bakr and Umar, both companions of Muhammad, hastened to the gathering upon learning about it. After a heated session, in which a chief of the Ansar was likely beaten into submission by Umar, those gathered at Saqifa agreed on Abu Bakr as the new head of the community.

Opposition to Saqifa 
The Saqifa event is said to have excluded Muhammad's family, who were preparing to bury him, and most of the Muhajirun. To protest the appointment of Abu Bakr, al-Baladhuri reports that the Banu Hashim (Muhammad's clan) and some of his companions gathered at Fatima's house. Among them were Muhammad's uncle Abbas and his companion Zubayr, according to Madelung. The protesters, including Fatima, held that her husband Ali was the rightful successor to Muhammad, possibly referring to Muhammad's announcement at Ghadir Khumm. Ali is believed to have explained this position to Abu Bakr.

Threats against Ali 
After the Saqifa affair, Abu Bakr reportedly tasked his ally Umar with securing Ali's pledge of allegiance. As noted by the Sunni al-Tabari, the latter led an armed mob to Ali's residence and threatened to set the house on fire if Ali and his supporters would not pledge their allegiance to Abu Bakr. The scene soon grew violent, and Zubayr was disarmed and carried away. The mob, however, retreated without Ali's pledge after Fatima pleaded with them, as reported in al-Imama wa al-siyasa. Alternatively, al-Baladhuri states that Ali capitulated and pledged allegiance to Abu Bakr immediately after Umar's threat. In contrast, the canonical Sahih al-Bukhari and Sahih Muslim relate that Ali pledged to Abu Bakr after Fatima died.

Attack on Fatima's house 

 
It is uncertain what followed the above altercation at Fatima's house. Some Shia sources report that Fatima suffered injuries during a raid on her house led by Umar, including the canonical Kitab al-Kafi.  

The allegations of violence are categorically rejected by Sunnis, though such claims appear in some Sunni historical sources: In his al-Saqifa wa Fadak, al-Jawhari includes a tradition to the effect that Umar and his men first threatened to set Fatima's house on fire. Then they entered the house, despite her pleas, and forced Ali and his supporters out of the house. The remainder of the account in al-Imama wa al-siyasa describes that Ali was pulled out of his house by force and threatened with death, according to Khetia. Mu'awiya is known to have alluded to the violent arrest of Ali in a letter to him before the Battle of Siffin. Al-Tabari notes that Abu Bakr regretted the events after Saqifa on his deathbed, writing that Abu Bakr wished he had "never opened Fatima's house to anything, even though they had locked it as a gesture of defiance."

Modern views 
Madelung is uncertain about the use of force. Still, he notes that there is evidence (in Sunni sources) that Fatima's house was searched. According to Madelung, Ali later repeatedly said that he would have resisted (Abu Bakr) had there been forty men with him. Alternatively, Buehler suggests that the allegations of violence should be treated with caution as they reflect the political agendas of the time. In contrast, Veccia Vaglieri is of the view that the Shia allegations are based on facts, even if they have been exaggerated. Abbas writes that some well-regarded Sunni sources mention Umar's raid and Fatima's injuries.

Sunni view 

Some Sunni authors record a fifth child of Fatima, named Muhsin. These include al-Baladhuri who maintains that Muhsin died in infancy. Al-Mas'udi and al-Ya'qubi also list Muhsin among the children of Fatima without alluding to miscarriage, though they have both been accused of Shia tendencies.

Shia view 
Some Shia sources report that Fatima suffered injuries during a raid on her house led by Umar, including the canonical Kitab al-Kafi. Many of these sources also allege that Fatima miscarried in this raid her son Muhsin, whose name had been chosen by Muhammad before his death, according to Abbas.

Kitab Sulaym ibn Qays

Authenticity of the book 
Perhaps the earliest and most detailed Shia account of Umar's raid appears in the Kitab Sulaym ibn Qays. The attribution of this collection of Shia hadiths to Sulaym, who might have been a close companion of Ali, is often rejected by Sunnis. On the other hand, when asked about it, the fifth Imam, Muhammad al-Baqir, is said to have confirmed the authenticity of the book. Nevertheless, there is no consensus among Shia theologians about the reliability of the whole book. After analyzing the text, Modarresi is of the view that the core of the text has been preserved and dates back to before 138 AH, while some parts of the book might be more recent, such as its prediction of black banners arriving from the East before the collapse of the Umayyads. At the same time, such instances of anachronism have been viewed by the Shia as prophesies on the part of the prophet and the Shia Imams, notes Khetia.

Attack 
Much of the post-Saqifa account in the Kitab Sulaym ibn Qays is similar to (Sunni) historical sources, but the book also contains explicit details of an alleged raid led by an impatient Umar on Fatima's house after multiple failed attempts to subdue Ali. The account is narrated on the authority of Salman, a close companion of both the prophet and Ali. In the final standoff, according to this account, Fatima refused the mob entry into the house, after which an enraged Umar ignored Fatima's pleas and set the door on fire, pushing his way into the house. Upon Fatima's resistance, the account describes that Umar physically assaulted her with a sheathed sword. The mob soon overpowered Ali and dragged him away, striking Fatima again as she tried to prevent it. The account states that Fatima still carried the bruises from this raid when she died soon after. A slightly different version of the book also contains a reference to Fatima's miscarriage, according to Soufi.

Kamil al-ziyarat 
Kamil al-ziyarat was compiled by al-Qummi, a distinguished Twelver traditionist. The book includes a hadith ascribed to the sixth Imam, Ja'far al-Sadiq, in which the prophet was informed during the Isra about the violent deaths of his family at the hands of Muslims. For his daughter Fatima, the report mentions her miscarriage and death because of her injuries during a raid on her house. This tradition is reported on the authority of Hammad ibn Uthman, a well-known companion of al-Sadiq and a mainstream Shia. As a result, this tradition is again viewed as authentic in Twelver hadith circles.

According to Khetia, this book contains the earliest reference to Fatima's miscarriage during Umar's raid. Alternatively, Soufi notes that a slightly different version of the Kitab Sulaym ibn Qays already refers to Fatima's miscarriage during the alleged attack.

Kitab al-Irshad 
This work was compiled by al-Mufid, another prominent Twelver theologian. Therein, al-Mufid only mentions the Shia belief in the miscarriage of Muhsin without referring to Umar or listing any traditions to support this belief. Considering that al-Mufid writes about violence against Fatima elsewhere, Khetia suspects that he refrained in his Kitab al-Irshad from controversial topics to render the book accessible to most Twelvers without provoking the anger of Sunnis.

Dala'il al-imama 
In his Dala'il al-imama, Ibn Rustam (4/11 century) includes a tradition from Ja'far al-Sadiq on the authority of Abu Basir, a prolific transmitter of hadith and a close companion of the sixth Imam. The rest of the chain of transmission includes some of the most prominent Shia authorities, and this hadith is thus viewed as reliable. The content of the hadith is very similar to the account found in the Kitab Sulaym ibn Qays, except that it adds that Fatima lost Muhsin when she was struck by a client of Umar, named Qunfudh, rather than Umar himself.

Death of Fatima 
Fatima died in 11/632, within six months of Muhammad's death. She was about eighteen or twenty-seven at that time according to Shia and Sunni sources, respectively. The Sunni view is that Fatima died from grief after Muhammad's death. Shia Islam, however, holds that Fatima's injuries during the raid by Umar directly caused her miscarriage and death shortly after.

Some sources report that Fatima never reconciled with Abu Bakr and Umar, partly based on a tradition to this effect in the canonical Sunni collection Sahih al-Bukhari. There are also some accounts that Abu Bakr and Umar visited Fatima on her deathbed to apologize, which Madelung considers self-incriminatory. As reported in al-Imama wa al-siyasa, Fatima reminded the two visitors of Muhammad's words, "Fatima is part of me, and whoever angers her has angered me." The dying Fatima then told the two that they had indeed angered her and that she would soon take her complaint to God and His prophet, Muhammad. There are also Sunni reports that Fatima reconciled with Abu Bakr and Umar, though Madelung suggests that they were invented to address the negative implications of Fatima's anger.

Following her will, Ali buried Fatima secretly at night. As noted by al-Tabari, her dying wish was that Abu Bakr should not attend the funeral, and this request was fulfilled by Ali. Her exact burial place in Medina remains uncertain.

Remembrance 
Muhsin ibn Ali is mourned by Twelver Shia Muslims as a martyr, a "prototype of all holy innocents in Islam," in the words of Massignon. He also draws a parallel between Muhsin and the infants killed at the order of King Herod in the Gospel accounts of the birth of Jesus.

References

Sources 
 
 
 
 
 
 

 
 
 
 
 
 
 
 
 
 
 
 
 
 

 
 
 
 
 
 
 
 
 
 
 

7th-century Arabs
Children of Ali
Infanticide
632 deaths
Fatimah
632 births